Primal graph  may refer to:

Primal graph (hypergraphs) of a hypergraph
A primal graph may be the planar graph from which a dual graph is formed
Primal constraint graph